Mersin road cycling race was held on 23-25 March 2012 in Mersin city, Turkey, as the second lap of the national road race.

Results
The team results for men were as follows

The only team qualified for women was Zeytinli Belediyesi (5.17.01).

References

Sport in Mersin
Mersin
2012 in Turkish sport
2012 in road cycling
March 2012 sports events in Turkey